The 1937–38 Hong Kong First Division League season was the 30th since its establishment.

Overview
South China B won the championship.

References
RSSSF

Hong Kong First Division League seasons
Hong
First